Mahmudabad (also Romanized as Maḩmūdābād; also known as Moḩammadābād, and Muhammadābād) is a village in Aliabad Rural District, Khafr District, Jahrom County, Fars Province, Iran. At the 2006 census, its population was 512, in 128 families.

References 

Populated places in  Jahrom County